José Manuel Lasa (born 21 May 1939) is a Spanish former cyclist. He competed in the individual road race at the 1964 Summer Olympics and finished fourth overall in the 1969 Vuelta a España. He is the older brother of fellow cyclist Miguel María Lasa.

Major results
1966
 3rd Overall Vuelta a La Rioja
1st Stage 1
 4th Overall Setmana Catalana de Ciclisme
1967
 1st Stage 2 Vuelta a La Rioja
 1st Stage 4b Grand Prix du Midi Libre
 5th Overall Tour de Romandie
 5th Overall Volta a Catalunya
 6th Road race, UCI Road World Championships
 10th Overall Eibarko Bizikleta
1968
 1st Stage 4 Eibarko Bizikleta
1969
 1st Klasika Primavera
 3rd Overall Vuelta a Andalucía
 3rd GP Pascuas
 4th Overall Vuelta a España
 5th Volta a la Comunitat Valenciana
 9th Overall Setmana Catalana de Ciclisme

References

External links
 

1940 births
Living people
Spanish male cyclists
Olympic cyclists of Spain
Cyclists at the 1964 Summer Olympics
People from Oiartzun
Sportspeople from Gipuzkoa
Cyclists from the Basque Country (autonomous community)